Pierce City Fire Station, Courthouse and Jail is a historic multipurpose fire station, courthouse, and jail building located at Pierce City, Lawrence County, Missouri.  It was built in 1886, and is a two-story, Italianate style brick building. It measures 25 feet by 75 feet. It features a distinctive square, hipped roof bell tower and tall vertically oriented windows topped by rectangular topped hoods. The building was the focal point of a race riot August 18–20, 1901, which received national attention and, in part, inspired Mark Twains essay "The United States of Lyncherdom".

It was listed on the National Register of Historic Places in 1998.

References

Government buildings on the National Register of Historic Places in Missouri
Italianate architecture in Missouri
Government buildings completed in 1886
Buildings and structures in Lawrence County, Missouri
National Register of Historic Places in Lawrence County, Missouri
Courthouses in Missouri
Jails in Missouri
Fire stations on the National Register of Historic Places in Missouri